Emmanuel College, formerly St. Paul's College, is a dual-campus independent Roman Catholic comprehensive co-educational secondary day school, occupying campuses in Altona North and Point Cook, in the south-western suburbs of Melbourne, Victoria, Australia.

History

Establishment 
St. Paul's Campus was originally established as 'St. Paul's College' in 1965, under the auspices of the American Order of the Society of Marianists. The order had been invited to establish this Catholic Secondary Boys' College by the then Archbishop of Melbourne, Daniel Mannix. The college's colours were then red, white and blue and its motto was Ecce Mater Tua (Latin: "Behold Thy Mother").

In 2008, the school opened a second campus at Point Cook called Notre Dame.

Building construction

St Pauls campus

In the early 1960s, the local parish priests purchased a large, 9 hectare, undeveloped block in Altona North. The parents of the school's initial students helped to build and landscape the school in the early years. The College's primary edifice, the three-storey building called the "Jubilee Building", was completed in 1969. Following to be completed were:

The Chaminade Library in 1971.
The Art/Craft/Science Lab and the senior classrooms known as the "Winters Building" in 1979.
The administrative complex and gymnasium in 1982.

The Jubilee Building was extensively renovated in 1998. In 2004, with the assistance of a Commonwealth Government grant, work commenced on enlarging the library complex and the building of two new computer labs. These developments were completed in 2005. In 2009–2010 three more developments were in place. These were the expansion of the Technology Building, construction of a new canteen, gym, changing rooms and toilets and the new McMahon Language Centre. These projects were funded by the National Building Stimulus Grant.

Notre Dame campus

Construction of the Notre Dame Campus in Point Cook commenced in mid-2007, with campus opening in 2008. The initial intake was restricted to year seven students, with construction continuing as further year levels commenced. The first group of year 12 students graduated from the Notre Dame campus in 2013.

Transition to Emmanuel College 
In 2006, the plans for the transition to Emmanuel College and the future of the school were commenced. 2008 saw the full transition from 'St. Paul's College' to 'Emmanuel College' with the acquisition of a second co-educational campus. The school eventually incorporated a new emblem and changed its motto to Life To The Full, which comes from the Gospel according to John: "I have come that they may have life and have it to the full" (John 10:10).

Headmaster and current staff 
Since 1997, the incumbent principal at the St. Paul's campus was Christopher Stock. In 2008 when the transition to Emmanuel College was complete, Stock became the principal of Emmanuel College with responsibility for the St. Paul's and the Notre Dame campuses until 2022, where Stock would step down as principal of the college.

House and homeroom system 
The Emmanuel College house system consists of five houses:
 McCoy (Navy)
 Cassidy (Red)
 McCluskey (Gold)
 Winters (Green)
 Chaminade (Sky blue)

These houses are named after the Marianists that initially helped serve and found the school, and Father John Cassidy of St Mary's Parish, Williamstown, who was involved in the establishment of the college. The exception is Chaminade, which is named after William Chaminade, the founder of The Marianist order. Both the St Paul's and Notre Dame campuses have homerooms with about 25–30 students, ranging from years 7–12.

Victorian Certificate of Education (VCE) 

Emmanuel College has offered the VCE program at the St. Paul's Campus since its implementation in 1990. The school tends to perform well in the VCE, with a student achieving an ATAR score of 99.15 in 2019, the highest ATAR of the school thus far.

Sport 
Emmanuel is a member of the Sports Association of Catholic Co-educational Secondary Schools (SACCSS) and the Associated Catholic Colleges (ACC).

ACC premierships 
Emmanuel has won the following ACC premierships.

 Golf - 2021
Soccer (2) - 2010, 2014

Notable alumni
Jordan Bos, football player for Melbourne City FC
Jason Duff, hockey player
Daniel Giansiracusa, former AFL player
Mick Martyn, former AFL player
Trent McKenzie, AFL player for Gold Coast Suns
James Podsiadly, former AFL player
Antonio Sagona, archaeologist and University of Melbourne professor
Bill Sheahan, cricket umpire
Rohan Smith, former AFL player
Mangok Mathiang (born 1992), Australian-Sudanese basketball player for Hapoel Eilat of the Israeli Basketball Premier League, former NBA player

See also

Mount St. Joseph Girls' College
List of schools in Victoria
Education in Victoria

References

External links
Emmanuel College Website

Catholic secondary schools in Melbourne
Associated Catholic Colleges
Educational institutions established in 1965
1965 establishments in Australia
Marianist schools
Buildings and structures in the City of Hobsons Bay
Buildings and structures in the City of Wyndham